Buford Ray Conley (born 1971) is an American scientist and businessman. His discoveries include the generalization of Child's Law and a novel hypothesis on the cause of aortic aneurysms. His professional career has focused on serving as an investment professional and executive primarily in technology companies.

Education and research 
In 1989, Conley was one of ten students on an Academic All Star Team according to local reporting; at the time, he was a senior at Fleming County High School and was a resident of Hillsboro, Kentucky.  Conley has published research on the performance of hybrid rocket propulsion and the design of space tethers with Robert Forward, and in the area of evolutionary pressures on emergence of diseases with Joon Yun.

Career 
Conley began his investing career at the investment fund Oak Hill Capital and later at Palo Alto Investors. Later, as Managing Partner of Finance Technology Leverage, he was Executive Chairman of Space Infrastructure Services LLC (SIS) in partnership with Space Systems Loral and DARPA to commercialize a $305 million robotic servicing satellite. He served on the board of directors of Aeries Acquisition Corporation, a publicly listed company and as the CEO of Benetic, a financial services technology company.

Publications

References 

American investors
American scientists
American businesspeople
1971 births
Living people